Wolfgang Hanisch (born 6 March 1951 in Großkorbetha, Sachsen-Anhalt) was an East German athlete who mainly competed in the javelin throw.

Hanisch had a long and successful international career competing for East Germany. He medalled in three consecutive editions of the European Athletics Championships, in Helsinki 1971, Rome 1974 and Prague 1978. His only Olympic appearance was the 1980 Summer Olympics held in Moscow, Soviet Union; there too, Hanisch was successful, winning the javelin bronze medal with a throw of 86.72 metres. However, gold in major meets eluded Hanisch. His most notable victory was in the 1979 IAAF World Cup in Montreal, Canada, when he brought the East German team the full points with a throw of 86.48.

Hanisch's personal best (with the old javelin design), thrown in Helsinki, Finland on 28 June 1978, was 91.14 metres, an East German record at the time.

References

1951 births
Living people
People from Weißenfels
East German male javelin throwers
German male javelin throwers
Sportspeople from Saxony-Anhalt
Olympic athletes of East Germany
Olympic bronze medalists for East Germany
Athletes (track and field) at the 1980 Summer Olympics
European Athletics Championships medalists
Medalists at the 1980 Summer Olympics
Olympic bronze medalists in athletics (track and field)